Elizabeth A. Lynn (born 1946) is a US writer most known for fantasy and to a lesser extent science fiction.  She is particularly known for being one of the first writers in science fiction or fantasy to introduce gay and lesbian characters; in honor of Lynn, the widely known California and New York-based chain of LGBT bookstores A Different Light took its name from her novel. She is a recipient of the World Fantasy Award—Novel.

Body of work

Elizabeth Lynn is an openly lesbian science fiction and fantasy writer who has written numerous works featuring positive gay protagonists. Her Chronicles of Tornor novels  (1979–80), the first book of which, Watchtower, won the World Fantasy Award, were among the first fantasy novels to have gay relationships as an unremarkable part of the cultural background, and included explicit and sympathetic depictions of same-sex love. The other books in this series are The Dancers of Arun (1979); and Northern Girl (1980) – the last of which is of particular lesbian interest.

Lynn's early science fiction novels were similarly ground-breaking in their treatment of sexual themes.  In The Sardonyx Net (1981), one of the primary characters is a sexual sadist. Her SF novel A Different Light (1978) featured a same-sex relationship between two men. The magical lesbian tale "The Woman Who Loved the Moon" also won a World Fantasy Award and is the title story in Lynn's The Woman Who Loved the Moon collection along with other gay speculative fiction stories.  Both these novels featured the science fiction concept hyperspace.

Lynn later returned to fiction with a fantasy series, again featuring gay relationships: Dragon's Winter (1998) and Dragon's Treasure (2004).

Bibliography

Series

 The Chronicles of Tornor
 Watchtower (1979), 
 The Dancers of Arun (1979), 
 The Northern Girl (1980), 
 Karadur Atani
 Dragon's Winter (1998), 
 Dragon's Treasure (2003),

Novels
 A Different Light (1978), 
 The Sardonyx Net (1981),

Short story collections
 The Woman Who Loved the Moon and Other Stories (1981), 
 Tales from a Vanished Country (1990)

Novellas
 The Red Hawk (1983)

Children's books
 The Silver Horse (1986) novel,

Non-fiction
 Babe Didrikson Zaharias: Champion Athlete (1989) (biography)

Selected short stories
 "We All Have to Go" (in Tricks and Treats, 1976)
 "Jubilee's Story" (in Millennial Women, 1978)
 "Wizard's Domain" (in Basilisk, ed. Ellen Kushner, 1980)
 "The Silver Dragon" (in Flights: Extreme Visions of Fantasy, 2004)

See also
 Feminist science fiction
 Homosexuality in speculative fiction

References

External links
 
 Elizabeth A. Lynn at SF Encyclopedia
 

1946 births
20th-century American novelists
21st-century American novelists
20th-century American women writers
21st-century American women writers
American fantasy writers
American science fiction writers
American women novelists
American women short story writers
American lesbian writers
American LGBT novelists
Living people
Women science fiction and fantasy writers
World Fantasy Award-winning writers
20th-century American short story writers
21st-century American short story writers